

Plants

Angiosperms

Dinosaurs

Plesiosaurs

New taxa

See also

References